Tierney Thys (born 1966) is an American marine biologist, science educator, and National Geographic explorer. In 1988 she earned a degree in biology from Brown University, and in 1998 she earned a doctorate in biomechanics. She was formerly the director of research at the Sea Studios Foundation. She was also the science editor for The Shape of Life and director for Strange Days on Planet Earth. She has also written, narrated and produced short films. Since 2000 she and her colleagues have been studying the giant ocean sunfish (mola). In 2004 she was named a National Geographic "Emerging Explorer". She has since joined National Geographic expeditions and developed a National Geographic children's television conservation series.

She has given two TED talks, "Swim with the giant sunfish", and "The secret life of plankton". As of 2015 she was producing an online series for TEDed titled Stories from the Sea.

A chapter of Earth Heroes: Champions of the Ocean, by Fran Hodgkins, is about her, and she is briefly profiled in Girls Research!: Amazing Tales of Female Scientists. Science Methods and Process Skills: Meet Tierney Thys, National Geographic Emerging Explorer, by Kathy Cabe Trundle, was published by National Geographic School Publishing in 2011.

She is a certified pilot and diver.

References

External links

 Meet Tierney Thys

1966 births
American marine biologists
Living people